Argyrophorodes anosibalis is a moth in the family Crambidae. It was described by Hubert Marion in 1957. It is found on Madagascar.

References

Acentropinae
Moths described in 1957
Moths of Madagascar